Boston Harborwalk is a public walkway that follows the edge of piers, wharves, beaches, and shoreline around Boston Harbor.

History
The Harborwalk is a cooperative project of the City of Boston, the Boston Planning and Development Agency, the Massachusetts Department of Environmental Protection, The Boston Harbor Association, and private property developers. Since 1984, the project has established parks, walking paths, educational sites, transportation facilities, and other amenities along the harbor.  Many developers of private land along the harbor have been required under the provisions of the Boston Zoning Code and of Chapter 91 of Massachusetts state law to set back new buildings from the water and to provide publicly accessible waterfront pathways.

A map of the proposed route shows that the completed Harborwalk will consist of a continuous trail from Charlestown in the north to Dorchester in the south, plus many other discontinuous trail segments. A map  and trail guide describe the current status of the route. An interactive map highlights sights along a portion of the walk in downtown Boston. As of 2016, 38 of the originally planned  of trail have been completed. Following the September 11 attacks, plans to extend the Harborwalk to the four miles of shoreline around Logan Airport were abandoned. As an alternative, planners are now considering an inland route connecting the Harborwalk through the East Boston Greenway to Constitution Beach.

Connections to other trails
The Harborwalk connects with many other trails. From north to south, these include the following:

East Coast Greenway
East Boston Greenway
Freedom Trail
Charles River Bike Paths
Millers River Trail
Proposed extension of Somerville Community Path
Rose Kennedy Greenway
Walk to the Sea
South Bay Harbor Trail
Lower Neponset River Trail
Quincy RiverWalk to Squantum Point Park

Public art

Sculptures and memorials, including some by noted artists, have been placed at many locations along the Harborwalk. Playful fish sculpture benches by Judy Kensley McKie and sculptures by Susumu Shingu and David Phillips have been created for Eastport Park, South Boston. Sculptures by Tony Smith, Willem de Kooning, Luis Jimenez, Dennis Oppenheim, William G. Tucker, and Sol LeWitt are located on the University of Massachusetts Boston campus. Between the Institute of Contemporary Art and the John Joseph Moakley United States Courthouse, a series of artworks by Ross Miller evoke moments in the history of Fan Pier. "Untitled Landscape" by David von Schlegell is located at Harbor Towers.

The East Boston part of the walk travels through an outdoor sculpture park, HarborArts, situated in a working industrial shipyard, the East Boston Shipyard and Marina.

An interactive musical sculpture, "Charlestown Bells," by Paul Matisse (grandson of the painter Henri Matisse) is located along the walkway of the Charles River Dam. The bells were installed in 2000, but had fallen into disrepair before a 2013 restoration.

Memorial sculptures found along the Harborwalk include a memorial to firefighter Robert M. Greene at Castle Island in South Boston; a Korean War Memorial at Shipyard Park in the Boston Navy Yard in Charlestown;  and a United States Maritime Service memorial in the North End's Langone Park.

Historical exhibitions

Along the Harborwalk are several indoor and outdoor displays of historical materials, some of which are available for view 24 hours a day. A selection from the archive of Norman B. Leventhal's collection of Maps of Boston Harbor and Massachusetts Bay is located in the lobby of the Boston Harbor Hotel. In the lobby of Building 114 at the Boston Navy Yard is an exhibition of boat models, photographs and boat building tools. The Maritime Museum at Battery Wharf was built by the developers of the Battery Wharf Hotel as "mitigation" under the state's Chapter 91 law, to compensate the public for private use of waterfront land.

Notable attractions

East Boston
Piers Park
Piers Park III (under development) 
Institute of Contemporary Art Watershed annex 
East Boston Shipyard/HarborArts
Logan Airport
Logan Airport Boat Dock
Constitution Beach

North of the Charles River
Charlestown 
Spaulding Rehabilitation Hospital
The Bunker Hill Monument
Boston Navy Yard, home of the USS Constitution, the USS Constitution Museum, and the USS Cassin Young
Paul Revere Park
The Zakim Bridge, the Charlestown Bridge, and the Charles River Dam

Downtown

TD Garden and North Station
North End
Copp's Hill
Coast Guard Base Boston
Christopher Columbus Waterfront Park
Faneuil Hall and Quincy Market
New England Aquarium
Historic wharves, including Union Wharf, Lewis Wharf, Long Wharf, Central Wharf, India Wharf, Rowes Wharf, and Russia Wharf
Custom House Tower and the Custom House District
Ferry service to Boston Harbor Islands National Recreation Area
Harbor Towers
South Station
Site of the Boston Tea Party
Northern Avenue Bridge
Fort Point Channel and Fort Point, including the Fort Point Pier kayak launch site

South Boston
Moakley Courthouse on the Fan Pier
Boston Children's Museum
Martin's Park
Institute of Contemporary Art
Boston Fish Pier
Leader Bank Pavilion
Harpoon Brewery (Tours )
Innovation and Design Building 
Castle Island
Carson Beach

On Columbia Point in Dorchester
University of Massachusetts Boston
Edward M. Kennedy Institute for the United States Senate
John F. Kennedy Presidential Library and Museum
Massachusetts Archives, home to such artifacts as the Massachusetts Constitution

Farther south
Pope John Paul II Park Reservation

Transportation connections
The Harborwalk is served by many MBTA bus lines.  Many public parking lots and garages are nearby.  The following subway and commuter rail stops serve the Harborwalk: Maverick Square in East Boston; North Station, Haymarket, Aquarium, and South Station in Downtown Boston; Courthouse, World Trade Center, and Silver Line Way in South Boston; and JFK/UMass and Savin Hill in Dorchester. MBTA Boat services stop at the Navy Yard in Charlestown, at Logan Airport in East Boston, and at Long Wharf and Rowes Wharf downtown.

Future development
New segments continue to be added to the walk as development occurs along the edge of the harbor.  A 2012 report prepared for The Boston Harbor Association concluded that approximately 60% of the total possible length of the Harborwalk has been completed.

In 2019, construction was completed on a residential building on the site of the former Anthony's Pier 4 Restaurant in South Boston.  The Harborwalk extends around the new building.

The St. Regis residences, a development proposal on a site adjacent to Pier 4, was opposed by an environmental group that argued that the proposal's accommodation of the Harborwalk was inadequate.  Construction began in 2019.

In October 2018, Boston Mayor Marty Walsh announced a comprehensive climate change adaptation proposal to protect the Boston Harbor coastline from flooding. In February 2022, Massachusetts Governor Charlie Baker announced an $8.2 million project to construct a 0.7-mile shared-use path from Tenean Beach on the Neponset River Reservation to Morrissey Boulevard and that will connect the Lower Neponset River Trail with the Harborwalk via Morrissey (including a 670-foot boardwalk in the salt marshes near the National Grid gas tank) that will be included in the $9.5 billion in federal funds the state government received under the Infrastructure Investment and Jobs Act.

Image gallery (from North to South)

Boston Globe photo essay

References

External links

Boston Planning and Development Agency web page on Harborwalk
Boston Harbor Now
Walk Boston
Bikeitorhikeit.org trail guide
Maplets.com trail maps
Boston Globe guide to the Harborwalk
New York Times guide to the Harborwalk

Boston Harbor
Bike paths in Massachusetts
Transportation in Boston
Financial District, Boston
North End, Boston